The 2015–16 Cypriot Third Division was the 45th season of the Cypriot third-level football league. Akritas Chlorakas won their 3rd title.

Format
Sixteen teams participated in the 2015–16 Cypriot Third Division. All teams played against each other twice, once at their home and once away. The team with the most points at the end of the season crowned champions. The first three teams were promoted to the 2016–17 Cypriot Second Division and the last three teams were relegated to the 2016–17 STOK Elite Division. However, after the end of the season Nikos & Sokratis Erimis withdrew from the 2016–17 Cypriot Third Division, and so the 14th-placed team remained to Third Division.

Point system
Teams received three points for a win, one point for a draw and zero points for a loss.

Changes from previous season
Teams promoted to 2015–16 Cypriot Second Division
 THOI Lakatamia
 ASIL Lysi
 PAEEK

Teams relegated from 2014–15 Cypriot Second Division
 APEP 

Teams promoted from 2014–15 Cypriot Fourth Division
 Alki Oroklini
 P.O. Xylotymbou
 Iraklis Gerolakkou
 Olympias Lympion
 Kouris Erimis

Teams relegated to 2015-16 STOK Elite Division
 Finikas Ayias Marinas Chrysochous

Stadia and locations

League standings

Results

See also
 Cypriot Third Division
 2015–16 Cypriot First Division
 2015–16 Cypriot Cup for lower divisions

Sources

References

Cypriot Third Division seasons
Cyprus
2015–16 in Cypriot football